Hair oil is an oil-based cosmetic product intended to improve the condition of hair. Various types of oils may be included in hair oil products. These often purport to aid with hair growth, dryness, or damage.

History 
Ancient Egyptians paid special attention to hair and images of hairdressers are depicted in ancient relics found by archaeologists. Archaic texts found during this era had information about “recipes” used by the Egyptians to tackle baldness. During this time period people used combs and ointments to groom and style their hair.

Uses 
Many cosmetic products including shampoo, heat protectant, hair drops, or hair masks contain oils.

Humans produce natural hair oil called sebum from glands around each follicle. Other mammals produce similar oils such as lanolin. Similar to natural oils, artificial hair oils can decrease scalp dryness by forming hydrophobic films that decrease transepidermal water loss, reducing evaporation of water from the skin. Oils on the hair can reduce the absorption of water that damages hair strands through repeated hygral stress as hair swells when wet, then shrinks as it dries. Oils also protect cuticle cells in the hair follicle and prevent the penetration of substances like surfactants. Saturated and monounsaturated oils diffuse into hair better than polyunsaturated ones.

Oil types 
Mineral and vegetable oils are used to make a variety of commercial and traditional hair oils. Coconut oil is a common ingredient. Other vegetable sources include almond, argan, babassu, burdock, Castor, and tea seed.

Natural oils are used more commonly as cosmetic products on the scalp. Natural oils come from natural resources that are very high in nutrients such as vitamins and fatty acids.

Coconut oil 
Coconut oil has properties that reduce protein loss in hair when used before and after wash. Coconut oil is known to have lauric acid, which is a type of fatty acid that may penetrate the hair shaft due to a low molecular weight and linear conformation.

Argan oil 
Argan oil originates from Morocco and is known for a conditioning effect that leaves hair soft and relieves frizz.

Avocado oil 
Avocado oil is rich in nutrients. It has a high concentration of  vitamin E, which is an antioxidant that may decrease hair loss and encourages hair growth.

Other oils 
Oils including almond oil, grapeseed oil, jojoba oil, olive oil may promote hair elasticity and help prevent dryness and hair damage.

See also
 Beard oil
 Pomade
 Shaving oil

References

Human hair
 Oils